2023

This is a list of American sportsperson-politicians.

List

See also
 List of sportsperson-politicians (international list)

References

Sportspeople
Politicians
Lists of people by second occupation
List